Claire Regina Fox, Baroness Fox of Buckley (born 5 June 1960), is a British writer, journalist, lecturer and politician who sits in the House of Lords as a non-affiliated life peer. She is the director and founder of the think tank Institute of Ideas.

A lifelong Eurosceptic, she was previously a member of the Revolutionary Communist Party but later began identifying as a libertarian. She became a registered supporter of the Brexit Party shortly after its formation and was elected as an MEP in the 2019 European Parliament election. She was nominated for a peerage by the Boris Johnson-led Conservative government in 2020, despite her past opposition to the existence of the House of Lords.

Early life and career 
Fox was born in 1960 to Irish Catholic parents, John Fox and Maura Cleary. She spent her early years in Buckley, Wales. After attending St Richard Gwyn Catholic High School in Flint, she studied at the University of Warwick where she graduated with a lower second class degree (2:2) in English and American Literature. She later gained a Professional Graduate Certificate in Education. From 1981 to 1987, she was a mental health social worker. She was later an English Language and Literature lecturer at Thurrock Technical College from 1987 to 1990 and at West Herts College from 1992 to 1999.

Revolutionary Communist Party 
Fox joined the Revolutionary Communist Party (RCP) as a student at the University of Warwick. For the next twenty years, she was one of the RCP's core activists and organisers. She became co-publisher of its magazine Living Marxism. When Living Marxism rebranded as LM in 1999, she organised its first conference.

LM closed in 2000 after it was found in court to have falsely accused Independent Television News (ITN) of faking evidence of the Bosnian genocide. In 2018, Fox refused to apologise for suggesting that evidence of the genocide was faked.

Fox stayed with her ex-RCP members when the group transformed itself in the early 2000s into a network around the web magazine Spiked Online and the Institute of Ideas, both based in the former RCP offices and promoting libertarianism. Author and environmental activist George Monbiot has argued these groups are part of the "pro-corporate libertarian right".

Media career 
After founding the Institute of Ideas, Fox became a guest panellist on BBC Radio 4 programme The Moral Maze and appeared as a panellist on BBC One's political television programme Question Time. She was criticised in The Guardian for rejecting multiculturalism as divisive and for her libertarian beliefs in the desirability of minimal governmental control and free speech in all contexts. She was also accused in 2005 of supporting "Gary Glitter's right to download child porn". 

In 2015, Fox was listed as one of BBC's 100 Women. Her book, I Find That Offensive!, was published in 2016.

Return to politics 
In April 2019, Fox became a registered supporter of the Brexit Party. She was in the first position in the list for the Brexit Party in the North West England constituency at the 2019 European Parliament election. Her selection was criticised by the father of murdered schoolboy Tim Parry for her past support for the Provisional Irish Republican Army and for the RCP's defence of the 1993 IRA Warrington bombings, which had killed his son within the North West England constituency. Another candidate for the Brexit Party, Sally Bate, resigned, citing Fox's "ambiguous position" on IRA violence. A Brexit Party spokesperson commented on the criticism of Fox: "It's a desperate attempt to cause trouble". Fox was subsequently elected to the European Parliament.

After standing down as an MEP when the United Kingdom left the EU on 31 January 2020, Fox was nominated for a peerage in July of that year. She sits as a non-affiliated peer. The Lord Caine, a long-serving Conservative Party adviser on Northern Ireland, criticised the decision, as did victims of IRA terror attacks. She previously claimed to be against the existence of the House of Lords, and congratulated Liberal Democrats for not taking up peerages in a 2015 tweet. She was created The Baroness Fox of Buckley on 14 September and was introduced to the Lords on 8 October 2020. On 7 June 2022, Fox reiterated her stance against the existence of the House of Lords, and claimed her decision to accept a life peerage as "pragmatic", resting on her belief such a position would provide a "platform" to enact political "change".

On 9 November 2020, speaking in the Lords in favour of the Internal Market Bill, Fox described international law as "a supranational instrument for undermining national sovereignty" and said that, rather than breaking the law, the UK government were making the law.

On 6 June 2022, she criticized the decision of Cineworld to cancel screenings of the movie The Lady of Heaven as a sign of a creeping extra-parliamentary blasphemy law. She likened it to cancel culture, calling it a disaster for the arts, dangerous for free speech and a lesson to those who don't see a threat in identity politics.

Personal life 
Fox is the elder sister of British writer Fiona Fox and Gemma Fox. Fiona was also a Living Marxism contributor and later became director of the non-profit organisation Science Media Centre.

References

External links 

 House of Lords: Baroness Fox of Buckley
 Institute of Ideas biography 

1960 births
20th-century Welsh educators
21st-century Welsh women politicians
21st-century Welsh women writers
21st-century Welsh writers
21st-century women MEPs for England
Alumni of the University of Greenwich
Alumni of the University of Warwick
BBC 100 Women
BBC people
Brexit Party MEPs
British Eurosceptics
British Marxists
British magazine publishers (people)
British people of Irish descent
British political commentators
British political writers
Critics of multiculturalism
English libertarians
English social workers
English women writers
Former Marxists
Free speech activists
Life peeresses created by Elizabeth II
Living people
MEPs for England 2019–2020
People educated at St Richard Gwyn Catholic High School, Flint
People from Buckley, Flintshire
Revolutionary Communist Party (UK, 1978) members
Teachers of English
Welsh libertarians
Welsh social workers